Robert Foster Jr. (born May 7, 1994) is an American football wide receiver who is a free agent. He played college football at Alabama and signed with the Buffalo Bills as an undrafted free agent in 2018. He has also been a member of the Green Bay Packers, Dallas Cowboys, and Miami Dolphins.

Early life
Foster attended Central Valley High School in Monaca, Pennsylvania, just outside Pittsburgh, where he played both football and basketball. While on the way to a football camp, he survived a shooting in which one of his teammates was killed. Coming out of high school, Foster was the nation's No. 2 receiver ranked 23rd overall in the 2013 class. A 4-star recruit, Foster committed to Alabama over offers from Florida, Michigan, Ohio State, and Pittsburgh, among others.

College career
During his redshirt sophomore season in 2015, Foster suffered a season-ending shoulder injury after catching 10 receptions 116 yards and two touchdowns in the first three games. He was limited in 2016 and considered transferring before deciding to stay with Alabama.

In 2017, he caught 14 passes for 174 yards and one touchdown. Overall, he caught 35 passes for 389 yards and three scores during his career at Alabama.

Professional career

Despite limited college statistics, Foster was invited to the 2018 NFL Scouting Combine due to his athleticism. He clocked a 4.41-second 40-yard dash, fifth overall among receivers.

Buffalo Bills

2018
Foster signed with the Buffalo Bills as an undrafted free agent on May 11, 2018, reuniting with Brian Daboll, his one-time offensive coordinator at Alabama. In Week 2, against the Los Angeles Chargers, he recorded his first two professional receptions, which went for 30 yards. He was waived on October 18, 2018, and was re-signed to the practice squad. He was promoted to the active roster on November 10, 2018.

Foster recorded his first 100-yard receiving game against the New York Jets on November 11, finishing with 105 yards on three receptions. Against the Jacksonville Jaguars two weeks later following the Bills' bye week, he recorded his first receiving touchdown, a 75-yard pass from Josh Allen. Foster finished that game with two receptions for 94 yards and the touchdown. In Week 13 against the Miami Dolphins he only caught one pass for 27 yards. In the next game against the New York Jets on December 9, he made a career high seven catches on eight targets for 104 yards. Against the Detroit Lions the following week, Foster excelled again, catching four passes for 108 yards, including a 42-yard touchdown from Allen, en route to a 14–13 Bills win. In the season finale, Foster caught four passes for 21 yards and a touchdown in a 42–17 win over Miami.

Foster mentioned being cut from the team, demoted to the practice squad, and being brought back again as a "wake-up call" that sparked his late-season success. He finished his rookie season with 27 receptions for 541 yards and 3 touchdowns while averaging 20 yards per reception and was named by Pro Football Focus to its all-rookie team as an offensive flex player.

2019
Foster was sparsely used in the Bills offense during his second professional season, as the team added veterans John Brown and Cole Beasley during the offseason. He also struggled with injuries during preseason. Foster caught just three of 18 targets for 64 yards, and was made inactive during the Bills' playoff game against the Houston Texans in favor of Duke Williams. He also rushed twice for 29 yards.

2020
On April 2, 2020, Foster was re-signed to a one-year contract by the Bills. He was waived as part of final roster cuts on September 5, 2020.

Green Bay Packers
On September 9, 2020, Foster was signed to the Green Bay Packers' practice squad.

Washington Football Team
On October 22, 2020, Foster was signed off the Packers' practice squad by the Washington Football Team.

Miami Dolphins
On March 18, 2021, Foster was signed by the Miami Dolphins. He was waived/injured on August 24, 2021, and placed on injured reserve. He was released on August 30.

Dallas Cowboys
On September 14, 2021, Foster was signed to the Dallas Cowboys practice squad. He signed a reserve/future contract with the Cowboys on January 18, 2022. He was waived on March 11, 2022.

New York Giants
On March 14, 2022, Foster was signed by the New York Giants. On August 19, 2022, Foster was placed on injured reserve with a hamstring injury. He was released on August 25. On October 10, 2022, he signed to the Giants practice squad. He was released on November 29.

Indianapolis Colts
On December 13, 2022, the Indianapolis Colts signed Foster to their practice squad. He was released two days later on December 15, 2022.

NFL career statistics

Regular season

References

External links
Miami Dolphins bio
Alabama Crimson Tide bio

1994 births
Living people
Alabama Crimson Tide football players
American football wide receivers
Buffalo Bills players
Dallas Cowboys players
Green Bay Packers players
Indianapolis Colts players
Miami Dolphins players
New York Giants players
Washington Football Team players
People from Monaca, Pennsylvania
Players of American football from Pennsylvania
Sportspeople from the Pittsburgh metropolitan area